Los Castillos may refer to:
Los Castillos, Catamarca, Argentina
Los Castillos, Herrera, Panama
Los Castillos, Veraguas, Panama

See also
 Castillos (disambiguation)
 Castillos, a small city in the Rocha Department of southeastern Uruguay
 Reserva Provincial Castillos de Pincheira, a protected natural area in Argentina